Antonio Gaona may refer to:

 Antonio Gaona (general)
 Antonio Gaona (actor)